Sandstorm, also released under the title Desert Storm Command, is a 1992 action game for DOS. The player must defend their home base from planes (which drop bombs), Patriot Missiles, and Scud missiles. If a missile or bomb touches the ground, some of the buildings in the base are damaged. Each building can be damaged three times. In other missions, a missile can be directed into designated enemy buildings.

External links
 
 Desert Storm Command gameplay at YouTube

1992 video games
Shoot 'em ups
DOS games
DOS-only games
Video games developed in the United States